Relation or relations may refer to:

General uses
International relations, the study of interconnection  of politics, economics, and law on a global level
Interpersonal relationship, association or acquaintance between two or more people
Public relations, managing the spread of information to the public
Sexual relations, or human sexual activity
Social relation, in social science, any social interaction between two or more individuals

Logic and philosophy
Relation (philosophy), links between properties of an object
Relational theory, framework to understand reality or a physical system

Mathematics

A finitary or n-ary relation is a set of n-tuples. Specific types of relations include:
Relation (mathematics) 
Binary relation (or correspondence, dyadic relation, or 2-place relation)
Equivalence relation
Homogeneous relation
Reflexive relation
Serial relation
Ternary relation (or triadic, 3-adic, 3-ary, 3-dimensional, or 3-place relation)

Relation may also refer to:
Directed relation
Relation algebra, an algebraic structure inspired by algebraic logic

Databases and ontology
Relational model, an approach to managing data
Relation (database), a component of a relational database
Relational algebra
Relational calculus
Relational database, a digital database
Relationships (also known as relations), one of the ontology components

Art and literature
Relation aller Fürnemmen und gedenckwürdigen Historien, the first newspaper
Relation (1982 film), a 1982 Japanese short experimental film
Relations (album), a 2004 album of cover versions by Kathryn Williams

See also
Relate (disambiguation)
Relationism (disambiguation)
Relationship (disambiguation)
Kinship, in anthropology and generally, the web of human social relationships, or an affinity between entities because of some characteristics
Coefficient of relationship in biology
Relative (disambiguation)
Relativism
Relativity (disambiguation)